Gatlopp: Hell of a Game (sometimes stylized as GATLOPP) is a 2022 American horror-comedy film directed by Alberto Belli.

Plot
Four estranged friends reunite to play Gatlopp, a drinking boardgame. They soon discover that they must complete the magical game before sunrise, or they will be doomed to play it for eternity.

Cast
Emmy Raver-Lampman - Sam
Jim Mahoney - Paul
Jon Bass - Cliff
Sarunas J. Jackson - Dominic
Shelley Hennig - Alice
Nancy Linehan Charles - Sheila
Patricia Belcher - Virginia
John Ales - Andre
Amy Davidson - Briana
Jeff Meacham - 80's Aerobic Announcer

Reviews

See also
Jumanji

References

External links

2022 comedy horror films
Films about board games